Cybalomia pentadalis is a species of moth in the family Crambidae. It is found in Greece, Turkey, Lebanon and Sudan.

References

Moths described in 1855
Cybalomiinae
Moths of Europe
Moths of Asia